Olive Higgins Prouty (10 January 1882 – 24 March 1974) was an American novelist and poet, best known for her 1923 novel Stella Dallas and her pioneering consideration of psychotherapy in her 1941 novel Now, Voyager.

Life and influence
Olive Higgins, who was born and raised in Worcester, Massachusetts, was a 1904 graduate of Smith College and married Louis Prouty in 1907, at which time the couple moved to Brookline, Massachusetts in 1908.

In 1894 Prouty was reported to have suffered from a nervous breakdown that lasted nearly two years according to the Clark University Archives and Special Collections. After the death of her daughter Olivia in 1923 Prouty suffered from another nervous breakdown in 1925.

Her poetry collection was published posthumously by Friends of the Goddard Library at Clark University, as 
Between the Barnacles and Bayberries: and Other Poems in 1997 after it was released for publication by her children Richard and Jane. In 1961, Prouty wrote her memoirs but, as her public profile had diminished, she could not find a publisher so had them printed at her own expense.

Prouty is also known for her philanthropic works, and for her resulting association with the writer Sylvia Plath, whom she encountered as a result of endowing a Smith College scholarship for "promising young writers". She supported Plath financially in the wake of Plath's unsuccessful 1953 suicide attempt: Plath's husband, Ted Hughes, would later refer in Birthday Letters to how “Prouty was there, tender and buoyant moon”.  Many, including Plath's mother Aurelia, have held the view that Plath employed her memories of Prouty as the basis of the character of "Philomena Guinea" in her 1963 novel, The Bell Jar, a figure who is described as supporting the protagonist because "at the peak of her career, she had been in an asylum as well", and who arguably represents a role model to be ultimately rejected by the protagonist.

Guidestar lists an Olive Higgins Prouty Foundation, Inc.

Stella Dallas was adapted into a stage play in 1924, a movie in 1925 and a popular 1937 melodrama of the same title starring Barbara Stanwyck that 
was nominated for two Academy Awards. It was remade in 1990 starring Bette Midler. A derivative radio serial was broadcast daily for 18 years, despite the legal efforts of Prouty, who had not authorized the sale of the broadcast rights, and was displeased with her characters' portrayals. Now, Voyager was made into a film of the same name in 1942, directed by Irving Rapper and starring Bette Davis in an acclaimed, Academy Award-nominated performance, as well as into a radio drama starring Ida Lupino and produced by Cecil B. de Mille on the Lux Radio Theater.

Family
Olive married Lewis Prouty in 1907; they had four children, Richard, Jane, Alice and Olivia; the latter two predeceased their mother.

The Vale Novels

Prouty's best-remembered writings are the five Vale novels, particularly the third in the series, Now, Voyager. Now, Voyager delves into the psychology of a woman, Charlotte Vale, who has lived too long under the thumb of an overbearing mother. An important character in the novel is Charlotte's psychiatrist, Dr. Jaquith, based on the fictionalization of Prouty's own therapy. He urges her to live her life to the fullest, taking to heart the words of Walt Whitman, "Now, Voyager, sail thou forth, to seek and find." Thanks in part to the help of Dr. Jaquith, by the end of the book Charlotte is very much enjoying her life as a Vale of Boston.

Retirement and death
Prouty wrote her last novel in 1951, the year of her husband's death. For the rest of her life, she lived quietly in the house in Brookline, Massachusetts, where she had moved in 1913.

She financed a scholarship to her alma mater, Smith College. The most famous recipient was the poet and novelist Sylvia Plath, whose talent was nurtured by Prouty despite Prouty's wealth and position. When Plath was hospitalized for psychiatric treatment at McLean Hospital, Prouty generously covered her expenses. Prouty stood by Plath until the latter's death in February 1963. Prouty's novel, "Now, Voyager" was one of the models for Plath's "The Bell Jar".

In old age she found comfort in her friendships, her charitable work, and the Unitarian church, First Parish in Brookline, which the Proutys had joined in the early 1920s.

She died in Brookline.

Memorials
In 1956 Prouty provided funding for the Prouty Memorial Garden and Terrace at Children's Hospital in Boston, created by the Olmstead Brothers landscape architecture firm. The garden, in memory of her two deceased children, is registered with the National Association for Olmsted Parks, and was honored with a gold medal by the Massachusetts Horticulture Society.  the hospital was considering replacing the garden with more buildings in the space occupied by the garden.

Bibliography

Novels
Bobbie, General Manager (1913)
The Fifth Wheel (1916)
The Star in the Window (1918)
Good Sports (1919)
Stella Dallas (1923)
Conflict (1927)
The White Fawn (1931), Lisa Vale (1938), Now, Voyager (1941), Home Port (1947), and  Fabia (1951), all focusing on the fictional Vale family

Memoirs
Pencil Shavings (1961)

Theatrical adaptations

Belknap: "Stella Dallas :  Book by Gertrude Purcell and Harry Wagstaff Gribble (from the novel by Olive Higgins Prouty). Produced by the Selwyns in New Haven (No specific location listed - No date) starring Mrs. Leslie Carter (Caroline Louise Dudley - 'The American Sarah Bernhardt'), Edward G. Robinson, Kay Harrison, Albert Marsh, Philip Earle, Clara Moores, Ruth Darby, Beatrice Moreland,  Almeda Fowler, Guy Milham, etc. Directed by Priestly Morrison."

See also
 Sentimental novel

References

External links

 
 
Profile of Olive Higgins Prouty Unitarian Universalists Association
Discussion of Olive Prouty's Vale novels
IMDb Now, Voyager, Olive Higgins Prouty
IMDb Stella Dallas
Lux Radio Theater at OTR.Network Library (BETA)
Clark University Archives and Special Collections
Worcester Writers' Project Olive Higgins Prouty
Stella Dallas Play in New Haven
American Libraries
The Fifth Wheel at Project Gutenberg.
The Star in the Window at Google Book Search.
Old Time Radio: "The Egyptian Mummy"
1925 Movie Stella Dallas
 

1882 births
1974 deaths
People from Brookline, Massachusetts
Writers from Worcester, Massachusetts
Smith College alumni
20th-century American philanthropists